Emergent evolution is the hypothesis that, in the course of evolution, some entirely new properties, such as mind and consciousness, appear at certain critical points, usually because of an unpredictable rearrangement of the already existing entities. The term was originated by the psychologist C. Lloyd Morgan in 1922 in his Gifford Lectures at St. Andrews, which would later be published as the 1923 book Emergent Evolution.

The hypothesis has been widely criticized for providing no mechanism to how entirely new properties emerge, and for its historical roots in teleology. Historically, emergent evolution has been described as an alternative to materialism and vitalism.

Historical context
The term emergent was first used to describe the concept by George Lewes in volume two of his 1875 book Problems of Life and Mind (p. 412).  Henri Bergson covered similar themes in his popular 1907 book Creative Evolution on the Élan vital.  Emergence was further developed by Samuel Alexander in his Gifford Lectures at Glasgow during 1916–18 and published as Space, Time, and Deity (1920).  The related term emergent evolution was coined by C. Lloyd Morgan in his own Gifford lectures of 1921–22 at St. Andrews and published as Emergent Evolution (1923). In an appendix to a lecture in his book, Morgan acknowledged the contributions of Roy Wood Sellars's Evolutionary Naturalism (1922).

Origins

Response to Darwin's Origin of Species 

Charles Darwin and Alfred Russel Wallace's presentation of natural selection, coupled to the idea of evolution in Western thought, had gained acceptance due to the wealth of observational data provided and the seeming replacement of divine law with natural law in the affairs of men. However, the mechanism of natural selection described at the time only explained how organisms adapted to variation. The cause of genetic variation was unknown at the time.

St. George Jackson Mivart's On the Genesis of Species (1872) and Edward Cope's Origin of the Fittest (1887) raised the need to address the origin of variation between members of a species. William Bateson in 1884 distinguished between the origin of novel variations and the action of natural selection (Materials for the Study of Variation Treated with Especial Regard to Discontinuity in the Origin of Species).

Wallace's further thoughts 

Wallace throughout his life continued to support and extend the scope of Darwin's theory of evolution via the mechanism of natural selection. One of his works, Darwinism, was often cited in support of Darwin's theory. He also worked to elaborate and extend Darwin and his ideas on natural selection. However, Wallace also realized that the scope and claim of the theory was limited. Darwin himself had limited it.

In examining this aspect, excluded ab initio by Darwin, Wallace came to the conclusion that Life itself cannot be understood except by means of a theory that includes "an organising and directive Life-Principle." These necessarily involve a "Creative Power", a "directive Mind" and finally "an ultimate Purpose" (the development of Man). It supports the view of John Hunter that "life is the cause, not the consequence" of the organisation of matter. Thus, life precedes matter and when it infuses matter, forms living matter (protoplasm).

Wallace then refers to the operation of another power called "mind" that utilizes the power of life and is connected with a higher realm than life or matter:

Proceeding from Hunter's view that Life is the directive power above and behind living matter, Wallace argues that logically, Mind is the cause of consciousness, which exists in different degrees and kinds in living matter.

Emergent evolution

Early roots 
The issue of how change in nature 'emerged' can be found in classical Greek thought -  order coming out of chaos and whether by chance or necessity. Aristotle spoke of wholes that were greater than the sum of their parts because of emergent properties. The second-century anatomist and physiologist Galen also distinguished between the resultant and emergent qualities of wholes. (Reid, p. 72)

Hegel spoke of the revolutionary progression of life from non-living to conscious and then to the spiritual and Kant perceived that simple parts of an organism interact to produce a progressively complex series of emergences of functional forms, a distinction that carried over to John Stuart Mill (1843), who stated that even chemical compounds have novel features that cannot be predicted from their elements. [Reid, p. 72]

The idea of an emergent quality that was something new in nature was further taken up by George Henry Lewes (1874–1875), who again noted, as with Galen earlier, that these evolutionary "emergent" qualities are distinguishable from adaptive, additive "resultants." Henry Drummond in The Descent of Man (1894) stated that emergence can be seen in the fact that the laws of nature are different for the organic or vital compared to the inertial inorganic realm.

As Reid points out, Drummond also realized that greater complexity brought greater adaptability. (Reid. p. 73)

Samuel Alexander took up the idea that emergences had properties that overruled the demands of the lower levels of organization. And more recently, this theme is taken up by John Holland (1998):

C. Lloyd Morgan and emergent evolution 
Another major scientist to question natural selection as the motive force of evolution was C. Lloyd Morgan, a zoologist and student of T.H. Huxley, who had a strong influence on Samuel Alexander. His Emergent Evolution (1923) established the central idea that an emergence might have the appearance of saltation but was best regarded as "a qualitative change of direction or critical turning point."(quoted in Reid, p. 73-74)  Morgan, due to his work in animal psychology, had earlier (1894) questioned the  continuity view of mental evolution, and held that there were various discontinuities in cross-species mental abilities. To offset any attempt to read anthropomorphism into his view, he created the famous, but often misunderstood methodological canon:
 

However, Morgan realizing that this was being misused to advocate reductionism (rather than as a general methodological caution), introduced a qualification into the second edition of his An Introduction to Comparative Psychology (1903):

As Reid observes,

Morgan also fought against the behaviorist school and clarified even more his emergent views on evolution:

His Animal Conduct (1930) explicitly distinguishes between three "grades" or "levels of mentality" which he labeled: 'percipient, perceptive, and reflective.' (p. 42)

Alexander and the emergence of mind 

Morgan's idea of a polaric relationship between lower and higher, was taken up by Samuel Alexander, who argued that the mental process is not reducible to the neural processes on which it depends at the physical-material level. Instead, they are two poles of a unity of function. Further, the neural process that expressed mental process itself possesses a quality (mind) that the other neural processes don’t. At the same time, the mental process, because it is functionally identical to this particular neural process, is also a vital one.

And mental process is also "something new, "a fresh creation", which precludes a psycho-physiological parallelism. Reductionism is also contrary to empirical fact.

At the same time Alexander stated that his view was not one of animism or vitalism, where the mind is an independent entity action on the brain, or conversely, acted upon by the brain. Mental activity is an emergent, a new "thing" not reducible to its initial neural parts.

For Alexander, the world unfolds in space-time, which has the inherent quality of motion. This motion through space-time results in new “complexities of motion” in the form of a new quality or emergent. The emergent retains the qualities of the prior “complexities of motion” but also has something new that was not there before. This something new comes with its own laws of behavior. Time is the quality that creates motion through Space, and matter is simply motion expressed in forms in Space, or as Alexander says a little later, “complexes of motion.” Matter arises out of the basic ground of Space-Time continuity and has an element of “body” (lower order) and an element of “mind” (higher order), or “the conception that a secondary quality is the mind of its primary substrate.”

Mind is an emergent from life and life itself is an emergent from matter. Each level contains and is interconnected with the level and qualities below it, and to the extent that it contains lower levels, these aspects are subject to the laws of that level. All mental functions are living, but not all living functions are mental; all living functions are physico-chemical, but not all physico-chemical processes are living - just as we could say that all people living in Ohio are Americans, but not all Americans live in Ohio. Thus, there are levels of existence, or natural jurisdictions, within a given higher level such that the higher level contains elements of each of the previous levels of existence. The physical level contains the pure dimensionality of Space-Time in addition to the emergent of physico-chemical processes; the next emergent level, life, also contains Space-Time as well as the physico-chemical in addition to the quality of life; the level of mind contains all of the previous three levels, plus consciousness. As a result of this nesting and inter-action of emergents, like fluid Russian dolls, higher emergents cannot be reduced to lower ones, and different laws and methods of inquiry are required for each level.

For Alexander, the "directing agency" or entelechy is found "in the principle or plan".

While an emergent is a higher complexity, it also results in a new simplicity as it brings a higher order into what was previously less ordered (a new simplex out of a complex). This new simplicity does not carry any of the qualities or aspects of that emergent level prior to it, but as noted, does still carry within it such lower levels so can be understood to that extent through the science of such levels, yet not itself be understood except by a science that is able to reveal the new laws and principles applicable to it.
 

The concept or idea of mind, the highest emergent known to us, being at our level, extends all the way down to pure dimensionality or Space-Time. In other words, time is the “mind” of motion, materialising is the “mind” of matter, living the “mind” of life. Motion through pure time (or life astronomical, mind ideational) emerges as matter “materialising” (geological time, life geological, mind existential), and this emerges as life “living” (biological time, life biological, mind experiential), which in turn give us mind “minding” (historical time, life historical, mind cognitional). But there is also an extension possible upwards of mind to what we call Deity.

Alexander goes back to the Greek idea of knowledge being “out there” in the object being contemplated. In that sense, there is not mental object (concept) “distinct” (that is, different in state of being) from the physical object, but only an apparent split between the two, which can then be brought together by proper compresence or participation of the consciousness in the object itself.

Because of the interconnectedness of the universe by virtue of Space-Time, and because the mind apprehends space, time and motion through a unity of sense and mind experience, there is a form of knowing that is intuitive (participative) - sense and reason are outgrowths from it.
 

In a sense, the universe is a participative one and open to participation by mind as well so that mind can intuitively know an object, contrary to what Kant asserted. Participation (togetherness) is something that is “enjoyed” (experienced) not contemplated, though in the higher level of consciousness, it would be contemplated.

Robert G. B. Reid

Emergent evolution was revived by Robert G. B. Reid (March 20, 1939 - May 28, 2016), a biology professor at the University of Victoria (in British Columbia, Canada). In his book Evolutionary Theory: The Unfinished Synthesis (1985), he stated that the modern evolutionary synthesis with its emphasis on natural selection is an incomplete picture of evolution, and emergent evolution can explain the origin of genetic variation. Biologist Ernst Mayr heavily criticized the book claiming it was a misinformed attack on natural selection. Mayr commented that Reid was working from an "obsolete conceptual framework", provided no solid evidence and that he was arguing for a teleological process of evolution. In 2004, biologist Samuel Scheiner stated that Reid's "presentation is both a caricature of evolutionary theory and severely out of date."

Reid later published the book Biological Emergences (2007) with a theory on how emergent novelties are generated in evolution. According to Massimo Pigliucci "Biological Emergences by Robert Reid is an interesting contribution to the ongoing debate on the status of evolutionary theory, but it is hard to separate the good stuff from the more dubious claims." Pigliucci noted a dubious claim in the book is that natural selection has no role in evolution. It was positively reviewed by biologist Alexander Badyaev who commented that "the book succeeds in drawing attention to an under appreciated aspect of the evolutionary process". Others have criticized Reid's unorthodox views on emergence and evolution.

See also

 The eclipse of Darwinism
 Emergentism is a corresponding belief in emergence.
 Evolutionary biology
  
 Orthogenesis
 Vitalism

References

Further reading 
 Alexander, Samuel. (1920). Space, Time, and Deity. Kessinger Publishing Reprint.  
 Bergson, Henri. (1911). Creative Evolution (English translation of L'Evolution créatrice). Dover Publications 1998: 
 Lewes, George H. (1875). Problems of Life and Mind. First Series: The Foundations of a Creed, vol. II. University of Michigan Library. 
 MacDougall, William. (1929). Modern Materialism and Emergent Evolution. London: Macmillan.
 Morgan, C. Lloyd. (1923). Emergent Evolution. Henry Holt and Co. 
 Patrick, G. T. W. (1923). Emergent Evolution by C. Lloyd Morgan. The Journal of Philosophy. Vol. 20, No. 26. pp. 714–718.

Evolution
Non-Darwinian evolution
Philosophical theories
Evolutionary biology
Holism